The men's shot put event at the 2023 European Athletics Indoor Championships was held on 2 March at 19:12 (qualification) and on 3 March at 19:25 (final) local time.

Medalists

Records

Results

Qualification
Qualification: Qualifying performance 21.20 (Q) or at least 8 best performers (q) advance to the Final.

Final

References

2023 European Athletics Indoor Championships
Shot put at the European Athletics Indoor Championships